William Henry Clarkson (September 27, 1898 – August 27, 1971), nicknamed "Blackie", was a pitcher in Major League Baseball. He played for the New York Giants and Boston Braves.

References

External links

1898 births
1971 deaths
Major League Baseball pitchers
New York Giants (NL) players
Boston Braves players
Baseball players from Virginia
Sportspeople from Portsmouth, Virginia